Anthony Blevins (born July 23, 1976) is a former American football player and current coach on the New York Giants in the National Football League (NFL). He played in the XFL on the Birmingham Thunderbolts and has been a full-time coach in the NFL since 2013.

Education
In addition Blevins has a vast array of college degrees from his bachelor's in Sociology, master's degree in Instructional Technology from UAB, as well as his doctorate in Instructional Systems and Work Force Development from Mississippi State, which he received while serving as a graduate assistant there.

Coaching career

College coaching career
Blevins began his career in coaching at Meadowcreek High School in  Georgia. He spent 2 years there working as the team’s secondary coach while also serving as a community liaison. From 2005-2007, he served as a graduate assistant at Mississippi State University. In 2008 he coached at the University of Tennessee-Martin working with the team’s cornerbacks while also serving as recruiting coordinator. Between 2009 and 2011, Blevins worked at Tennessee State coaching the special teams and cornerbacks. In 2012 Blevins returned to his alma mater as the Blazers’ cornerbacks coach.

Arizona Cardinals
From 2013 to 2017, Blevins worked under Bruce Arians as an assistant special teams coach for the Arizona Cardinals.

New York Giants
In 2018, Blevins became a part of Pat Shurmur’s staff  where he spent two seasons as the Giants' assistant special teams coach  directly under Thomas McGaughey. In 2020 he was retained by Joe Judge who he coached with at Mississippi State  and became the team’s assistant secondary coach. In 2021 he was named the team’s assistant linebackers coach and special teams assistant. He was retained by Brian Daboll and moved to the team’s assistant special teams coach.

References 

Living people
1976 births
African-American coaches of American football
African-American players of American football
Arizona Cardinals coaches
Mississippi State Bulldogs football coaches
New York Giants coaches
Players of American football from Birmingham, Alabama
Sportspeople from Birmingham, Alabama
UAB Blazers football coaches
UAB Blazers football players
21st-century African-American sportspeople
20th-century African-American sportspeople